Beirut Film Festival may refer to:

Beirut International Film Festival
Beirut International Women Film Festival